Ibănești may refer to several places in Romania:

 Ibănești, Botoșani, a commune in Botoșani County
 Ibănești, Mureș, a commune in Mureș County
 Ibănești, Vaslui, a commune in Vaslui County
 Ibănești, a village in Cungrea commune, Olt County